The 2021–22 Evansville Purple Aces men's basketball team represented the University of Evansville in the 2021–22 NCAA Division I men's basketball season. The Purple Aces were led by head coach Todd Lickliter in his second full season at Evansville and played their home games at the Ford Center as members of the Missouri Valley Conference (MVC). They finished the season 6–24, 2–16 in MVC play to finish in last place. They lost to Valparaiso in the first round of the MVC tournament.

Previous season
In a season limited due to the ongoing COVID-19 pandemic, the Purple Aces finished the 2020–21 season 9–16, 7–11 in MVC play to finish in a three-way tie for fifth place. As the No. 5 seed in the MVC tournament, they lost to Indiana State in the quarterfinals.

Roster

Schedule and results

|-
!colspan=9 style=| Exhibition

|-
!colspan=9 style=| Regular season

|-
!colspan=12 style=| MVC tournament

Source

References

Evansville Purple Aces men's basketball seasons
Evansville
Evansville